Ashok Kumar Gupta (Hindi: अशोक कुमार गुप्ता) was an Indian civil servant and served as the Chairperson of the Competition Commission of India. He was formerly Secretary to the Government of India in the Department of Defence Production as well as CMD, Tamil Nadu Cements; Special Secretary (Finance), Government of Tamil Nadu; and District Magistrate, Villupuram. He has also served on the Boards of Central and State PSUs such as Hindustan Aeronautics Ltd., Heavy Engineering Corporation, and Tamil Nadu Cements. Gupta has contributed to the formulation of the Centre's Automobile Policy, Prime Minister’s Rojgar Yojana, and ‘Make’ Procedure in defence procurement.

Education 
Gupta has a degree in Mechanical Engineering from Delhi University. Subsequently, he received a Master of Public Administration (M.P.A.) from Syracuse University (SU). Gupta’s Master’s project at SU, "Regulatory Framework for Health Care Organisations in India", contributed to the Central Government’s decision of enacting the Clinical Establishments (Registration and Regulation) Act, 2010. Gupta received his M.Phil. in Defence and Strategic Studies from the University of Madras.

Career

As an IAS Officer 
Gupta joined the Indian Administrative Service (IAS) in 1981 and served in the following posts:

 Secretary, Department of Defence Production, Government of India;
 Additional/Special Secretary, Department of Defence Production, Government of India;
 Joint Secretary, Department of Defence, Government of India;
 Joint Secretary. & Sr. Directing Staff, National Defence College;
 Joint Secretary, Department of Health, Ministry of Health and Family Welfare, Government of India;
 Director, Department of Heavy Industry, Government of India;
 Director, Department of Small Scale Industries, Ministry of Industry, Government of India;
 Special Secretary, Finance, Government of Tamil Nadu;
 Additional Secretary/Special Secretary, Prohibition & Excise, Government of Tamil Nadu;
 Chairman & Managing Director, Tamil Nadu Cements;
 Managing Director, Tamil Nadu Steels; and
 Deputy Chairman, Chennai Port Trust.

Competition Commission of India (CCI) 
Gupta was appointed chair of the Competition Commission of India (CCI) on 12 November 2018 and has focused on reinforcing the Commission’s enforcement and advocacy actions in digital markets and responding to the disruptions caused by the COVID-19 pandemic.

Chairperson, National Financial Reporting Authority (NFRA) 
Gupta held the additional charge of Chairperson, National Financial Reporting Authority (NFRA) from 1 October 2021 to 31 March 2022.

Hony. Chairman, Forum of Indian Regulators (FOIR) 
Gupta is the current Hony. Chairman of the Forum of Indian Regulators (FOIR).

References 

Indian civil servants
Living people
Indian politicians
Syracuse University alumni
University of Madras alumni
Delhi University
1957 births
Academic staff of the National Defence College, India